The 2009 Men's Pan American Cup was the third edition of the Men's Pan American Cup, the quadrennial men's international field hockey championship of the Americas organized by the Pan American Hockey Federation. It was held between 7 and 15 March 2009 in Santiago, Chile.

The tournament doubled as the qualifier to the 2010 World Cup to be held in New Delhi, India. The winner would qualify directly while teams ranked between 2nd and 4th would have the chance to obtain one of three berths at the World Cup Qualifiers.

Canada won the tournament for the first time after defeating the United States 2–1 in the final, earning an automatic berth at the 2010 World Cup.

Umpires
Below are the 11 umpires appointed by the Pan American Hockey Federation:

Saleem Aaron (USA)
Diego Barbas (ARG)
Brian Burrows (BAR)
Fernando Gomez (ARG)
John Hrytsak (CAN)
Eduardo Lizana (ESP)
Daniel Lopez Ramos (URU)
Albert Marcano (TRI)
Gus Soteriades (USA)
Nathan Stagno (GIB)
Aruturo Vasquez Serrano (MEX)

Results
All times are Chile Daylight Time (UTC−03:00)

First round

Pool A

Pool B

Fifth to eighth place classification

5–8th place semi-finals

Seventh place game

Fifth place game

First to fourth place classification

Semi-finals

Third place game

Final

Statistics

Final standings

 Qualified for the World Cup

 Qualified for the World Cup Qualifiers

Awards

See also
2004 Women's Pan American Cup

References

External links
Official website

Men's Pan American Cup
Pan American Cup
Pan American Cup
Sports competitions in Santiago
International field hockey competitions hosted by Chile
Pan American Cup
Qualification tournaments for the 2011 Pan American Games
2000s in Santiago, Chile
Pan American Cup